Mission Federal Credit Union, also known as Mission Fed, is a financial institution based in and exclusively serving San Diego County. Mission Fed is federally insured by the National Credit Union Administration and is an Equal Housing Lender. Mission Fed is accredited by the Better Business Bureau.

Origin
Mission Fed was founded in 1961 as Public Schools Federal Credit Union, with membership open to those working in the educational community. In 1978, the credit union changed its name to Mission Federal Credit Union and in 2003 expanded its membership to include all San Diegans.

Community Involvement
Mission Fed participates in outreach programs and a variety of partnerships with education and other nonprofits across the San Diego county. Some of Mission Fed's community partners include Junior Achievement, the San Diego Zoo & Safari Park, Mission Federal ArtWalk and the Boys & Girls Club of Greater San Diego. This strong focus on giving back contributed to Mission Fed winning the prestigious honor of 2013 San Diego Philanthropic Corporation of the Year Award from the Association of Fundraising Professionals (AFP).

References

Credit unions based in California
Companies based in San Diego
1961 establishments in California
Banks established in 1961